Meganola togatulalis is a species of moth belonging to the family Nolidae.

It is native to Europe.

References

Nolidae
Moths described in 1796